Abdel Metalsi (born 19 April 1994) is a footballer who played as a defender for Sportlust '46. Born in the Netherlands, he represented Bosnia and Herzegovina at under-21 international level.

Club career
Metalsi made his professional debut in the Eerste Divisie for Almere City on 7 August 2015 in a game against VVV Venlo.

As of the season 2017–18 Abdel played in the Bosnian Premiership for the club Mladost Doboj Kakanj. After a spell at FC Lienden and in Slovakia, he returned to Holland and joined amateur side Sportlust '46.

References

External links
 
 fkmladost.ba
 nfsbih.ba
 

1994 births
Living people
Dutch people of Bosnia and Herzegovina descent
Bosnia and Herzegovina footballers
Footballers from Utrecht (city)
Association football defenders
Bosnia and Herzegovina under-21 international footballers
Eerste Divisie players
Tweede Divisie players
Derde Divisie players
Slovak Super Liga players
SBV Vitesse players
Almere City FC players
FK Mladost Doboj Kakanj players
FC Lienden players
ŠKF Sereď players
Sportlust '46 players
Bosnia and Herzegovina expatriate footballers
Dutch expatriate footballers
Bosnia and Herzegovina expatriate sportspeople in Slovakia
Dutch expatriate sportspeople in Slovakia
Expatriate footballers in Slovakia